Karl-Heinz Grasser (born 2 January 1969) is a former Austrian politician (FPÖ at first and later associated with but never officially a member of the ÖVP), who held the office of Austrian Finance Minister from February 2000 to January 2007 as a member of the two subsequent governments of Wolfgang Schüssel. While at the time praised by many for consolidating Austria's budget, he has since then been known for his involvement in major corruption scandals. In 2020, Grasser was sentenced to 8 years in prison for corruption. For some time, he was also some kind of a jet set person after marrying Fiona Swarovski, the heir of the Swarovski crystal manufacturers in Tyrol, Austria.

Early career 
He was born in Klagenfurt, Carinthia, where he studied business administration at the University of Klagenfurt from 1988 to 1992. He soon joined the far right nationalist Austrian Freedom Party and became the second deputy governor of Carinthia in 1994, but after a dispute with his mentor, Jörg Haider, he left politics to work for Magna Europe as a vice president for human resources and public relations.

Minister of finance 
However, in 2000 he returned to politics, when a coalition was formed between the Austrian People's Party and the Freedom Party. At that time, he was the youngest minister of finance ever to hold office in Austria. When the coalition broke up in 2002, Grasser left his party, but after national elections in November and the reestablishment of the coalition under the lead of a strengthened People's Party, Grasser again became minister, this time being nominated by the People's Party.

Grasser remains a controversial figure. While supporters argue that he successfully consolidated Austria's budget deficit, critics see him as incompetent and an opportunist. Grasser's policies and philosophy as a finance minister suggest a neoliberal stance. He is a self-proclaimed follower of the Austrian School of economics. His immaculate appearance, his smooth-talking dynamism, and his yuppie antics have made him hugely popular with the public.

During the early year of his tenure as Finance Minister, he was generally perceived as the young and competent figure needed to shake up the traditional ways of the ruling parties that were becoming increasingly unpopular. From early on in Grasser's tenure as Finance Minister there have been recurring suspicions of backroom deals between Grasser and some of his political and business friends. The first major case was the affair behind the financing of Grasser's personal homepage in 2004.

Corruption allegations 
Meanwhile, in January 2011, new and continuing investigations by Austrian district attorneys into suspicions of kickback schemes and backroom deals and, in certain cases, alleged manipulation of federal spending figures to syphon money to his allies have brought Grasser in front of the Austrian media once more. These reports have been spearheaded by the Vienna weekly Der Falter. More details on the allegations can be found on Wikipedia in German. Grasser maintains his innocence on all counts.

Regardless of the outcome of the large number of court cases filed by district attorneys against Grasser and by Grasser against individuals), it seems clear that his public image as the "new-and-squeaky-clean" politician of a new era has been tarnished once and for all. After Green MP Gabriela Moser and Falter published transcripts of police recordings of Grasser's telephone conversations with one of his friends, Walter Meischberger, in which Meischberger could not describe the services for which he was paid hundreds of thousands of euros by the Porr construction company, the phrase "Was war meine Leistung?" (What was my service [for that payment]?) entered popular usage. Falter arranged a public reading of the transcripts by a group of comedians.

In Austrian quality newspapers, Grasser's case is now seen as a test of credibility for the Austrian judicial system: the legal protection from prosecution of former politicians is confronted with rumours about Grasser's alleged quagmire of corruption. It will be seen if the Austrian judicial system is up to the task. At present, in an interview by Grasser with the Austrian radio station Ö1 on 22 January 2011, Grasser threatened to sue anyone who criticized his behaviour. "Nothing will come of [any law suit against me]", Grasser said. Instead, he is suing a number of people and announcing that he will sue others.

On 5 May 2011, new allegations have to come to light. The magazine Format quotes from police reports that Grasser, between 2005 and 2007 during his tenure as finance minister of the Republic of Austria, on three occasions personally carried "cases of cash" from Switzerland to Austria. Grasser said that the money was given to him, in cash, by his future mother in law, heiress to the Swarovski Crystal company, a claim she denies.

On 26 May 2011, Austrian Finance police searched ten of Grasser's private and business dwellings on suspicion of embezzling up to 3 million euro from the Austrian tax system during and after his time as finance minister. Finance police removed 35 boxes of files, computers and mobile phones. If found guilty, Grasser would face up to ten years in federal prison, would have to pay back the money and face hefty fines in the million euro range (as a percentage of the non-declared income).
Grasser, who was abroad at the time of the searches, maintains his innocence. Delivering messages via his attorney to the Austrian media, Grasser describes the case as a "politically motivated act".

As of 27 May 2011, the Austrian judiciary has not launched a court challenge against Grasser. Already, this affair has become one of the most opaque and dubious money and embezzlement schemes in the public eye. In August 2013, new details have come to light. Gernot Rumpold, Grasser's friend and Freedom party associate, was sentenced to 3 years in federal prison for embezzlement charges (the ruling can still be appealed).

The Austrian monthly magazine Format, cites police investigation reports that links Grasser not just to the 500,000 Euros he confessed to bringing, in a suitcase, across the border to Liechtenstein during his tenure as Austrian Federal Minister of Finance, but to a total of 1.6 million Euro that were found in offshore bank accounts (allegedly, as Grasser claims, to make an investment "for his mother-in-law"). In August 2013, Austrian finance police has expressed serious doubt as to the source of the 20 cash transfers amounting to the 1.6 million Euros now identified by Austrian police after almost five years of investigation. The irregularities and sums involved, the fact that substantial sums were directed—always via offshore and Liechtenstein bank accounts or in suitcases—in highly complex investment constructions linked to dummy companies seems to point towards a mesh of corruption and embezzling that might become one of the biggest personal corruption scheme in post-WWII Austria.

On 22 August 2013, the magazine Format and Austrian daily newspaper Der Standard reported on Grasser potentially facing up to 10 years in prison for tax evasion and tax fraud, in addition to fines that may amount up to 20 million Euros. It has been unheard of in post-WWII Austria that a former minister would potentially face such stiff sentencing, though, after five years of painstaking research into Grasser's complex of mailbox companies in offshore locations and in Liechtenstein (which is independent from the Austrian judicial system) by the Austrian Federal Financial Police, Grasser's explanation that he did not understand the constructions but followed the advice of his accountant, seem, given his background in Finance and his role as Austrian Finance Minister, doubtful.

In December 2020 he was sentenced to 8 years in prison.

Departure from politics 
On 9 January 2007, Grasser announced his departure from politics to return to the private sector. He was considering a position in investment banking at Salomon Smith Barney, of Citigroup, But instead engaged in a number of small-scale lobbying and investment firms, most of which were short-lived, including Meinl International Power, Valora Solutions, SMW OG, and a real estate company GPS.

References 

1969 births
University of Klagenfurt alumni
Finance Ministers of Austria
Freedom Party of Austria politicians
Living people
Politicians from Klagenfurt
21st-century Austrian politicians